Diego Tadeo González (1733 - 1794) was a Spanish poet.

Spanish male writers
People from the Province of Salamanca
1733 births
1794 deaths
University of Salamanca alumni